Megistostegium is a genus of trees and shrubs in the family Malvaceae. The species are all endemic to Madagascar. The genus is threatened by livestock grazing, invasive plants and threats to pollinators.

Species
Three species are recognised:
 Megistostegium microphyllum  
 Megistostegium nodulosum  
 Megistostegium perrieri

References

Hibisceae
Malvaceae genera